Rock Island is a city in and the county seat of Rock Island County, Illinois, United States. The original Rock Island, from which the city name is derived, is now called Arsenal Island. The population was 37,108 at the 2020 census. Located on the Mississippi River, it is one of the Quad Cities, along with neighboring Moline, East Moline, and the Iowa cities of Davenport and Bettendorf. The Quad Cities has a population of about 380,000. The city is home to Rock Island Arsenal, the largest government-owned weapons manufacturing arsenal in the US, which employs 6,000 people.

The Rock Island–Milan School District, Rockridge School District (southwest portion of city) along with private schools, serve the city. The District (Downtown Rock Island) has art galleries and theaters, nightclubs and coffee shops, and restaurants of all flavors. Golf courses, parks, a casino, botanical center, marina, historic tours, bike paths, and festivals offer entertainment opportunities.

History

European-American Settlement

The original portion of what is now known as Rock Island was called Farnhamsburg – after the original two homes were built by Colonel George Davenport and Russell Farnham in 1826. Davenport and Farnham were business partners, trading with the local Native Americans. The original city plat was filed on July 10, 1835, and was named Stephenson. It was renamed Rock Island in March 1841.

This area has been a fortuitous place first for settlement and then for steamboat traffic, bridges, and railroads.

Railroads and development

The Chicago, Rock Island & Pacific Railroad (RI) was founded here in 1851, known informally as the Rock Island Line; over the next century, the railroad grew to serve fourteen states but ended in bankruptcy in 1980. As part of later nineteenth-century development, two first-class hotels: the Harper House (built by Ben Harper and opened in February 1871) and the Rock Island House were built in town. The Rock Island Arsenal has manufactured military equipment and ordnance for the U.S. Army since the 1880s.

The Rock Island Southern Railway was an interurban line that ran from Rock Island to Monmouth, Illinois, then onward to Galesburg, Illinois. It was built between 1906 and 1910. A portion of the trackage, from Rock Island to Preemption, Illinois, was shared with the CRI&P line that served the coal mines in Cable, Illinois, and Sherrard, Illinois. The line finally folded in 1952.

Bridges

Due to its geography, Rock Island has a rich history of bridge building, including the first railroad bridge across the Mississippi (now gone), an unusual two-track railroad bridge, and the largest roller dam in the world.

The first railroad bridge across the Mississippi River was built between Arsenal Island and Davenport in 1856. Many steamboat pilots felt that the bridge had been intentionally positioned to make it hard for them to navigate, and this conflict reflected a larger rivalry: St. Louis and its steamboats against Chicago and its railroads. Two weeks after the bridge opened, the steamboat Effie Afton collided with the bridge, caught fire, and damaged the bridge. The owner of the Effie Afton sued the bridge company for damages, and Abraham Lincoln was one of the lawyers who defended the railroad. This test case was appealed to the United States Supreme Court, which ruled in favor of the railroad in 1872. Although the original bridge is long gone, a monument exists on Arsenal Island marking the Illinois side. On the Iowa side, the bridge was located near where 4th and Federal streets intersect with River Drive.

The Lock and Dam No. 15 and the Government Bridge are located just southwest of the site of the first bridge. The Government Bridge, completed in 1896, is notable for having two sets of railroad tracks above the car lanes. There are only two bridges in the world with this feature. Three other bridges span the river between Rock Island and Davenport. The Crescent Rail Bridge is a railroad-only bridge, completed in 1899. The Centennial Bridge was completed in 1940 for autos only. The newest bridge is the Interstate 280 bridge, completed in 1973. Lock and Dam No. 15, completed in 1934 as a federal Works Progress Administration (WPA) project during the Great Depression, is the largest roller dam in the world.  The dam is designed for navigation, not flood control.  During flood season, the rollers are raised, unleashing the full flow of the water.

On the south side of the city, overlooked by the Black Hawk State Historic Site, are auto and railroad crossings of the Rock River to Milan, Illinois. This set of bridges also crosses the historic Hennepin Canal and Sears Dam (this was named after the entrepreneur David B. Sears, who previously built the Sears Dam between Arsenal Island and Moline.)  In 2007 a new bridge was completed between 3rd Street Moline/southeast Rock Island and Milan. It expedites the trip to Milan, the airport, and points south on U.S. Route 67.

Geography
Rock Island is located at  (41.489083, -90.573154).

Climate

Demographics

2020 census

Note: the US Census treats Hispanic/Latino as an ethnic category. This table excludes Latinos from the racial categories and assigns them to a separate category. Hispanics/Latinos can be of any race

2010 Census
In 2000 Census, there were 39,684 people, 16,148 households, and 9,543 families residing in the city. The racial makeup of the city was 77.13% White, 17.17% African American, 0.28% Native American, 0.75% Asian, 0.07% Pacific Islander, 2.41% from other races, and 2.19% from two or more races. Hispanic or Latino of any race were 5.90% of the population.

There were 16,148 households, out of which 26.4% had children under the age of 18 living with them, 41.2% were married couples living together, 14.2% had a female householder with no husband present, and 40.9% were non-families. 34.5% of all households were made up of individuals, and 14.3% had someone living alone who was 65 years of age or older. The average household size was 2.31 and the average family size was 2.97.

The city's population was spread out, with 23.0% under the age of 18, 13.1% from 18 to 24, 25.7% from 25 to 44, 21.9% from 45 to 64, and 16.3% who were 65 years of age or older. The median age was 36 years. For every 100 females, there were 89.5 males. For every 100 females age 18 and over, there were 86.1 males.

The median income for a household in the city was $34,729, and the median income for a family was $45,127. Males had a median income of $32,815 versus $23,378 for females. The per capita income for the city was $19,202. About 10.9% of families and 14.5% of the population were below the poverty line, including 22.5% of those under age 18 and 8.4% of those age 65 or over.

Economy

Largest employers
According to the city's 2017 Comprehensive Annual Financial Report, the largest employers in the city are:

Development 
Construction will begin in April 2017 for a new Rock Island County courthouse. The 46,000 square foot building will have three stories that house four courtrooms, judges offices, a law library, and both the Circuit Clerk and States Attorneys offices. The $28 million project is expected to be completed in the fall of 2018. The old courthouse is expected to be torn down upon completion of the new building.

Education
The majority of the city is served by the Rock Island–Milan School District with portions of the southwest area falling under the Rockridge School District. The Rock Island–Milan School District is currently home to 13 public schools, with one high school, two junior high schools, nine elementary schools, and one alternative education center. Several private schools also serve Rock Island, including Jordan Catholic Elementary School and Alleman Catholic High School.

High schools 
 Alleman High School
 Rock Island High School
 Rockridge High School (Taylor Ridge, Illinois)

Colleges 

 Augustana College
 Bible Missionary Institute

Former schools
Villa de Chantal Catholic school closed in 1978, and the building was destroyed by fire in 2005.  Schools that were closed and demolished include Franklin Junior High School, Central Junior High School, Lincoln Elementary School, and Audubon Elementary School.

Points of interest 

 Augustana College (Illinois)
 Bally's Quad Cities Casino & Hotel
 Black Hawk State Historic Site
 Broadway Historic District
 Chippiannock Cemetery
 Hauberg Civic Center
 Longview Park Conservatory and Gardens
 Quad City Botanical Center
 Rock Island Public Library
 The Historic Rock Island Courthouse
 Rock Island Arsenal is a National Historic Landmark
 The District
 Boetje's Mustard Factory

Rock Island, Illinois is the site of the Quad City Hindu Temple, a Hindu shrine dedicated chiefly to the deity Venkateswara.  The temple opened in 2007.  Prior to its construction, Hindu worshippers had to travel to St. Louis or Peoria to participate in Hindu festivals and worship.

Cultural organizations
 Ballet Quad Cities
 Genesius Guild
 The Quad City Symphony Orchestra plays part of its Masterworks Series' concerts at Centennial Hall on the Augustana College campus.
 Quad City Arts

Sports

The first football game in what was to become the National Football League was played at Rock Island's Douglas Field in September, 1920. It was hosted by the Rock Island Independents (1907–1926), who were a charter NFL franchise in 1920.

The Rock Island Islanders were a minor league baseball team that played for 37 seasons between 1901 and 1948. The Islanders played at Douglas Park and were affiliates of the Cincinnati Reds and Philadelphia A's.

The Rock Island Legion Post 200 baseball team won the 4th State Championship in its history in 2011 in Galesburg, Illinois. Post 200 would finish 4th that year in the Great Lakes Regional.

Karters flock to Rock Island every year for the prestigious Rock Island Grand Prix on Labor Day weekend, which attracts competitors from across the United States and the world. With exception to 1997, when the annual race was canceled due to legal liability issues, the Rock Island Grand Prix has been held every year since 1994.

Rock Island High School has won state championships in basketball, girls and boys track, softball, and wrestling. Additionally the football and basketball programs are perennial powerhouses. Rock Island Public Schools Stadium has an artificial surface and has a seating capacity of over 15,000.

Media

Rock Island is the location of television station WHBF-TV. Until 1963, WHBF was one of only two television stations in the Quad Cities area. (The other is WOC-TV on the Iowa side of the river.)  Rock Island was also the longtime former home of WHBF-TV's former sister radio stations, WHBF and WHBF-FM, although it does remain the licensed city of those stations.

Also, National Public Radio member station WVIK is licensed to and located in Rock Island on the campus of Augustana College, and WGVV-LP, which is also licensed to the city of Rock Island.

Rock Island is the home base for NOAA Weather Radio WXJ-73, the Quad Cities' area NWR station, programmed by the National Weather Service in Davenport.

Film, theater, and literary references 
 Around the World in Eighty Days (Jules Verne, 1873) has Phileas Fogg crossing the Mississippi River at Rock Island.
 The song "Rock Island Line" was first recorded in 1934. Its many recorded versions include ones by John Lomax, Lonnie Donegan, Johnny Cash and Bobby Darin. A version is sung by Kevin Spacey in his film of Darin's life, Beyond the Sea.
 In the 1936 Margaret Mitchell novel Gone with the Wind, Ashley Wilkes was imprisoned on Arsenal Island during the Civil War.
  Rock Island Trail (1950), starring Forrest Tucker, was a Republic Studios production related to the building of the Rock Island Railroad across the Mississippi River.
 The opening 'railroad train' number in Meredith Willson's The Music Man (1957) is titled "Rock Island", although the words "Rock Island" never appear in the song. The song takes place on a train journey from Brighton, Illinois to the (fictional) River City, Iowa, and the title suggests the journey includes the train's crossing though Rock Island.
 Rock Island is one of the markers of the outer edge of the range of Project X in Ayn Rand's novel Atlas Shrugged.
 Rock Island is mentioned several times in Jack Kerouac's book On the Road. Sal (Jack Kerouac) says that it was in Rock Island "for the first time in my life that I saw my beloved Mississippi River dry in the summer haze."
 Rock Island Line is the title of a 1975 novel by David Rhodes.
 In the 1977 episode "Breaker, Breaker" of Good Times, where Nathan Bookman hides a CB radio in the Evans' apartment, during a scene where Willona Woods gets on the CB with a man who says he's coming back into Chicago from "that Rock Island town" and wanted to know if she and Millicent "Penny" Gordon Woods could meet up.
 The Blues Brothers are from Rock Island.
 In the 1996 film Hard Eight, John, played by John C. Reilly, says that they are staying in Rock Island, Illinois.
 In the 2001 film America's Sweethearts, Larry King takes a call from a viewer in Rock Island, Illinois.
 Part of the film Road to Perdition (2002) takes place in Rock Island. The first track of the soundtrack is entitled Rock Island.  The movie was based on the 1998 graphic novel, which was in turn based on the life of Rock Island gangster John Looney.
 In the 2006 film Death of a President, Al Claybon, the character behind the assassination of George W. Bush, resided in Rock Island.
 In the 2016 film War Dogs, the US military interviews main characters David Packouz and Efraim Diveroli at the Rock Island Arsenal.

Notable people 

 David Ackles, singer-songwriter, pianist, and child actor
 Eddie Albert, Oscar-nominated actor and activist, known for television series, Green Acres and Switch, and films
 Black Hawk, leader and warrior of the Sauk American Indian tribe
 Ken Bowman, Ken Duncan and Herm Schneidman, players for NFL's Green Bay Packers
 George Davenport, American frontiersman, trader, U.S. Army soldier, and Indian agent
 Steve Decker, catcher with the San Francisco Giants, Florida Marlins, Colorado Rockies and Anaheim Angels
 Frederick Denkmann, lumber mogul and partner of Friedrich Weyerhäuser
 Pony Diehl, Wild West outlaw
 Booker Edgerson, Buffalo Bills
 Lane Evans, former United States Congressman (Illinois 17th District); born in Rock Island
 Russell Farnham, one of the first settlers of the area, and a partner of George Davenport
 Virginia Frederick, Illinois state representative
 Daniel G. Garnsey, former U.S. Congressman
 Aaron H. Grout, son of Governor Josiah Grout and Vermont Secretary of State
 June Haver, screen and radio actress; wife of actor Fred MacMurray
 Chase Hilgenbrinck, former professional soccer player with the New England Revolution
 Roger Imhof, actor and performer in motion pictures, vaudeville, burlesque and the circus
 Jesse Johnson, musician, guitarist for group "The Time", as well as solo artist
 Mark Johnson, Olympic wrestler and winningest wrestling coach at the University of Illinois
 Madison Keys, professional tennis player
 Lou Kolls, MLB umpire
 Kari Lake, news reporter and politician in Arizona
 Helen Mack, screen and stage actress; born in Rock Island
 Jerry Mansfield, NFL player
 Elisabeth Maurus (aka Lissie), folk-rock singer and songwriter; born in Rock Island
 Tim Moore, stage, screen and television actor; first black TV star
 Don Nelson, forward and head coach with several NBA teams, most all-time wins as a head coach
 Greg Norton, former bassist of the hardcore punk band Hüsker Dü
 Col. Gary Payton, astronaut
 Chasson Randle, basketball player and all-time leading scorer at Stanford
 Paul E. Rink, Illinois judge, lawyer, and politician
 Harry Sage, catcher with the Toledo Maumees
 Bobby Schilling, U.S. Congressman from Illinois's 17th congressional district
 Dred Scott, American slave who sued for his freedom
 J. Clinton Searle, Illinois state representative and lawyer
 Michael H. Sexton, Minor League Baseball executive 
 Tom Sexton, shortstop with 19th century's Milwaukee Brewers
 Thomas P. Sinnett, Illinois politician and lawyer
 Charles A. Spring, Presbyterian leader and son of Samuel Spring
 Henry Strasak, Federal Bureau of Investigation (FBI) and Central Intelligence Agency (CIA) officer
 Lefty Taber, pitcher for the Philadelphia Phillies; born in Rock Island
 Jason Tanamor, writer and author; part-time resident of Rock Island
 Hiram Truesdale, lawyer and jurist
 Jonathan Tweet, game designer, author, blogger
 Samuel Rinnah Van Sant, Civil War soldier, Governor of Minnesota 1901-05
 Henry Cantwell Wallace, U.S. Secretary of Agriculture 1921-24
 Friedrich Weyerhäuser, lumber mogul
 Bill Zies, catcher with the St. Louis Cardinals
 Lester Ziffren, journalist and Hollywood screenwriter

See also 
 Mayor of Rock Island, Illinois
 List of crossings of the Upper Mississippi River
 Rock Island Independents – former NFL franchise
 Daytrotter – National Music Website Based in Rock Island
 List of tallest buildings in the Quad Cities

References

Footnotes

General references
 Spencer, J. W. and Burrows, J. M. D.,  The Early Day of Rock Island and Davenport The Lakeside Press, 1942
 Tweet, Roald D., ''The Quad Cities: An America mosaic", East Hall Press, 1996
 Wickstrom, George W., The Town Crier J. W. Potter Company, 1948

External links

 City website
 QCOnline.com – Rock Island Argus/Moline Dispatch Newspaper
 Quad-City Times
 

 
Cities in Illinois
Cities in Rock Island County, Illinois
Illinois populated places on the Mississippi River
County seats in Illinois
Cities in the Quad Cities
Populated places established in 1835
1835 establishments in Illinois